
The Bacchiglione ("Little Medoacus") is a river that flows in Veneto, northern Italy. It rises in the Alps and empties about  later into the Brenta River near Chioggia. It flows through and past a number of cities, including Vicenza and Padua. It acted for many centuries as a significant waterway up to Vicenza, above which it ceases to be navigable. It was connected in the 19th century to the Adige by a canal.

Course

The river starts in some springs in the towns of Dueville and Villaverla, in the province of Vicenza.  Here it is called "Bacchiglioncello". Just upstream of the city of Vicenza receives water from the Leogra Timonchio (which descends from Mount Pasubio).  At this junction, the river becomes the Bacchiglione.

At Ponte del Bo, above Vicenza, it joins with the Orolo. In Vicenza, the Bacchiglione is joined by the rivers Tesina, Retrone and Astichello. The average flow of the Bacchiglione in Padua is about 30 m3/s and flows through the summer dry season.

Bisatto Canal
At Longare, the Bisatto (or "Bisato") Canal was built in the twelfth century. Verona and Vicenza built it to divert water away from Padua during the many political struggles of the time, as told in the ninth canto of Dante's "Paradiso". The channel goes to Lozzo Atestino and Este; then continues to Monselice ("Este - Montelice Canal").  Then into the Battaglia Terme ("Battle Canal" or "Monselice Canal"), where it meets the Battaglia Canal from Padua. Through the Vigenzone Canal ("Cagnola Canal ") waters are reunited with the river Bacchiglione ("Channel Pontelongo"), allowing Vicenza to arrive in Chioggia without having to pass through Padua.

Brentella Canal
The Brentella Canal originates from the Brenta River in Limena, where the flow is regulated by a hydraulic barrier (the "Colmelloni"), and joins the Bacchiglione just before Padua's airport. The Brentella Canal was built in 1314 Padua to prevent the city of Vicenza from stopping the river when it created the Bisatto Canal.

Battaglia Canal
On the southern outskirts of Padua, the Battaglia Canal begins.  Built in the 12th century, it heads south towards Battaglia Spa. This is connection from the Canal Bisatto, which separated from the Bacchiglione River at Vicenza. Through the Channel Vigenzone and then "Channel Cagnola", to flow again in the final stretch of the Bacchiglione ("Pontelongo Canal").

Scaricatore Canal
To prevent flood damage in the second half of the nineteenth century the Scaricatore Canal was built. It starts from Bassanello and carries the excess water from the Padua River (Channel Roncajette), near the town of Voltabarozzo.

Bridges 
The Ponte San Lorenzo, a Roman bridge largely underground, along with the ancient Ponte Molino, Ponte Altinate, Ponte Corvo and Ponte S. Matteo.

Ponte San Lorenzo, Padua, one of the earliest Roman segmental arch bridges
Ponte Molino, Padua, another segmental arch bridge of Roman origin

References

Sources
 .

Rivers of Italy
Rivers of the Province of Padua
Rivers of the Province of Vicenza
Waterways of Italy